Lac-Beauport is a town in the Capitale-Nationale region of Quebec, Canada, located on the eponymous Lake Beauport. It has a population of about 8,200 people, and lies about 25 kilometres north from downtown Quebec City. 
Lac-Beauport is the home of Le Relais ski centre.

Geography
The municipality of Lac-Beauport surrounds the homonymous lake. It is bounded to the south by Quebec City, to the north and west by the united townships of Stoneham-et-Tewkesbury and to the east by the municipality of Sainte-Brigitte-de-Laval. Located in the Laurentians massif, the municipality occupies the basin centered on the lake as well as the surrounding hills and mountains.

History
Around 1820, a small cluster of homes was built on the present site of the municipality, named Waterloo Settlement by the English immigrants after the Anglo-Prussian victory at Waterloo. In 1845, the Municipality of St-Dunstan was formed, named after the local parish of Saint-Dunstan-du-Lac-Beauport. It was abolished in 1847, but reestablished as the Parish Municipality of Saint-Dunstan-du-Lac-Beauport in 1855. In common use, it was only known as Lac-Beauport, prompting the town council to officially change the name in 1989.

Demographics

Population

Language
Mother tongue:
 English as first language: 2.3%
 French as first language: 95.5%
 English and French as first language: 1%
 Other as first language: 1%

See also
List of municipalities in Quebec

References

External links

Municipalities in Quebec
Incorporated places in Capitale-Nationale